Kunamneni Sambasiva Rao (born 1966) is an Indian politician and leader of Communist Party of India (CPI). He was elected as a member of Andhra Pradesh Legislative Assembly from Kothagudem in 2009. He was elected as secretary of CPI Telangana State Council in September 2022.

References

Communist Party of India politicians from Telangana
Andhra Pradesh MLAs 2009–2014
Living people
1966 births